Nordic Growth Market (NGM Exchange) is a regulated exchange that delivers trading, exchange technology and public company services. The exchange operates in Sweden, Finland, Denmark, and Norway and was established in 1984. Since 2008, Nordic Growth Market is a fully owned subsidiary of Börse Stuttgart, one of the leading exchanges in Europe.

Nordic Growth Market operates NDX (Nordic Derivatives Exchange) — one of the leading markets for listing and electronic trading of derivatives and structured products in the Nordic region. 

The exchange also provides listing and trading services in equities via two capital markets; NGM Equity and Nordic MTF. In 2013, they introduced Nordic Pre Market, a platform for unlisted companies.

Nordic Growth Market is recognized for their innovative technology and their trading system Elasticia proves a track record of zero downtime since its launch in 2010. Nordic Growth Market trades all instruments on one single platform, serving a central gateway to the Nordic financial market.

Nordic Growth Market is the only exchange in the world who offers revenue sharing — meaning that they share their revenues with listed companies.

References

External links 
http://www.ngm.se
http://www.fi.se/Folder-EN/Startpage/About-FI

Economy of Stockholm
Economy of Sweden
Stock exchanges in Europe
Nordic organizations